The Diocesan Shrine and Parish of St. Mary Magdalene (Filipino: Pangdiyosesis na Dambana at Parokya ni Santa Maria Magdalena and Simbahan ng Pililla), also known as Pililla Church, is a Roman Catholic Church located in the municipality of Pillila, Province of Rizal, Philippines. The church was built by the Franciscans in 1583, under the patronage of St. Mary Magdalene. It is a few kilometers away from San Ildefonso Parish Church, a historical church in Tanay.

On January 16, 1977, the National Historical Commission of the Philippines unveiled the historical marker of St. Mary Magdalene Parish Church.

On July 22, 2018, The parish was declared as a diocesan shrine.

History 

In 1571, the Spaniards conquered and inhabited the towns along Laguna de Bay. Prior to Spanish colonization, Pililla was named Pilang Munti. It was incorporated to the administration of Morong and was named Pilang Morong.

The Franciscan priests led by Fr. Diego de Oropesa and Fr. Juan de Plasencia arrived at Pilang Morong in 1572. As part of the established reducciones system, the Franciscans built the first church made from cogon and nipa in 1583. When Pilang Morong was given autonomy in 1599, the central government granted an authorization to construct a church of stone.

In 1632, a conflagration destroyed the church and the whole town. When a new church was built, another destruction by fire ruined the church in 1668. A new church was immediately completed between 1670 and 1673. Renovation of the church altar and the adjacent convent were completed in 1848. Several renovation projects were also completed between 1962 and 1976.

Features 

The church is made of adobe, similar to other churches in Laguna. The façade and belfry of the church are simple in design. The Baptistery is located at the bottom of the bell tower, on the left side from the vestibule of the church. A small retablo housing the image of St. Mary Magdalene can be found inside the baptistery.

Gallery

References

External links 

 Diocesan Shrine and Parish of Saint Mary Magdalene on Facebook
 St. Mary Magdalene Parish Church

Roman Catholic churches in Rizal
Churches in the Roman Catholic Diocese of Antipolo